Aswathy Sasikumar is a Malayalam language short story writer from Kerala, India. Her first short story collection Josephinte Manam has won the 2017 Yuva Puraskar and the 2015 Kerala Sahitya Akademi Geetha Hiranyan Endowment. She has also received several other awards including Vaikkom Muhammad Basheer Awardand EP Sushama Ankanam Award.

Biography 
Aswathy was born in 1991, in Vellathuval, Idukki district the daughter of Sasikumar and Shyamala sasikumar. Her mother Shyamala Sasikumar initially wrote poetry but later stopped writing poetry, entered politics and became the president of the Adimali Block Panchayath. After some time, the family left Idukki and settled in Kochi, Ernakulam district. Aswathy has been writing stories since her school days. Josepinte Manam (Meaning:The Smell of Joseph) is her first published short story collection.

Aswathy is an engineer by profession. She lives with her husband Sunil, an Indian Air Force officer, in Agra, Uttar Pradesh.

Short story collections
. A collection of  20 short stories, for which she won Yuva Puraskar and Kerala Sahitya Akademi Geetha Hiranyan Endowment.
.
.

Awards and honors

References

1991 births
Living people
Malayalam-language writers
Indian women short story writers
Malayali people
People from Idukki district
Recipients of the Sahitya Akademi Yuva Puraskar
21st-century Indian short story writers